City FM is a private FM radio station in Bangladesh. Broadcasting on 96.0 FM in Dhaka, it started its official transmission on March 23, 2013. The station was officially opened by Hasanul Haq Inu, Bangladesh's federal Minister of Information.

References

External links
 

Radio stations in Bangladesh